Tarnowski (feminine: Tarnowska; plural: Tarnowscy) is a Polish-language toponymic surname derived from the city of Tarnów.

Related surnames

People
 Tarnowski family, a Polish noble family
 Adam Tarnowski (senior) (1866–1946), Polish and Austrian-Hungarian diplomat
 Adam Tarnowski (minister) (1892–1956), Polish and Austrian-Hungarian diplomat
 Alfred Tarnowski (1917–2003), Polish chess player
 Barbara Tarnowska (c. 1566–1610), Polish noblewoman
 Dorota Tarnowska (c. 1513 – c. 1540), Polish noblewoman
 Jan Tarnowski (1488–1561), Polish military commander and statesman
 Jan "Ciezki" Tarnowski (c. 1479–1527), Polish nobleman
 Jan Feliks "Szram" Tarnowski (1471–1507), Polish nobleman
 Jan Krzysztof Tarnowski (1537–1567), Polish nobleman
 Josef Tarnowski (1922–2010), Polish electronics engineer and intelligence officer
 Marcin Tarnowski (born 1985), Polish footballer
 Maria Tarnowska (1877–1949), Russian convict
 Maria Tarnowska (nurse) (1880–1965), Polish nurse
 Paweł Tarnowski (footballer) (born 1990), Polish footballer
 Paweł Tarnowski (sailor) (born 1994), Polish sailor
 Stanisław Tarnowski (1837–1917), Polish politician
 Władysław Tarnowski (1836–1878), Polish composer
 Zofia Tarnowska (1534–1570), Polish noblewoman
 Sophie Moss, nee Tarnowska (1917–2009), Polish humanitarian

See also
 
 

Polish-language surnames
Toponymic surnames

pl:Tarnowski